Aspidoras lakoi is a tropical freshwater fish belonging to the Corydoradinae sub-family of the  family Callichthyidae. It originates in inland waters in South America, and is found in the upper Paraná River basin in Brazil.

It feeds on worms, benthic crustaceans, insects, and plant matter. It lays eggs in dense vegetation and adults do not guard the eggs.

See also
List of freshwater aquarium fish species

References 

Callichthyidae
Fish of South America
Fauna of Brazil
Fish of Brazil
Fish described in 1949